The following is a timeline of the history of the city of Murcia, Spain.

Prior to 20th century

 8th C. -  Moors took possession of Medinat Mursiya.
 1172 - Almohades in power.
 1243 - Forces of Ferdinand III of Castile take Murcia.
 1265 - Conquest of Murcia (1265–66).
 1269 - Rising against King Alfonso the wise led to Murcia joining the Kingdom of Castile.
 1272 - University of Murcia first established by King Alfonso the wise
 1291 - Made an episcopal see.
 1467 - Murcia Cathedral built.
 1487 - Printing press in use.
 1651 - Flood.
 1736 -  rebuilt.
 1786 -  (garden) established.
 1810 - City besieged by French forces.
 1812 - City besieged by French forces again.
 1829 - March: 1829 Torrevieja earthquake.
 1842 - Population: 82,517.
 1862 -  (theatre) opens.
 1863 - Murcia del Carmen railway station opened.
 1864 - Archaeological Museum of Murcia founded.
 1879
 October: .
  newspaper begins publication.(es)
 1887 - Population: 98,538.
 1892 -  (theatre) opens.
 1900 - Population: 111,539.

20th century

 1903 - La Verdad newspaper begins publication.
 1907 - Flood.
 1910
  (museum) built.
 Archaeological Museum of Murcia relocated.
 Population: 125,057.
 1915 - University of Murcia established.
 1917 -  founded.
 1919 - Real Murcia founded.
 1930 - Population: 158,724.
 1931 - Archivo Histórico Provincial de Murcia (provincial archives) established.
 1940 - Population: 193,731.
 1960 - Population: 249,738.
 1988 -  newspaper begins publication.
 1991 - Population: 338,250.
 1995 -  (convention centre) opens.
 1996
  (library) established.
 Universidad Católica San Antonio de Murcia founded.

21st century

 2011
 Murcia tram starts operation.
 Population: 437,667.
 2015 - José Ballesta becomes mayor.
 2019 - Murcia–San Javier Airport opens.

See also
 Murcia history
 History of Murcia

Other cities in the autonomous community of the Region of Murcia:(es)
 Timeline of Cartagena, Spain
 List of municipalities in Murcia province

References

This article incorporates information from the Spanish Wikipedia.

Bibliography

in English
 
 
 
 
 
 

in Spanish

External links

 Items related to Murcia, various dates (via Europeana)
 Items related to Murcia, various dates (via Digital Public Library of America)

Murcia
Murcia